The Diminutive worm eel (Pseudomyrophis fugesae) is an eel in the family Ophichthidae (worm/snake eels). It was described by John E. McCosker, Eugenia Brandt Böhlke and James Erwin Böhlke in 1989. It is a marine, temperate water-dwelling eel which is known from the western Atlantic Ocean.

References

Fish described in 1989
Pseudomyrophis